Carney Park is a United States military recreational facility located in the caldera of Campiglione, in the dormant volcano mount Gauro, in the Phlegraean Fields near Naples, Italy. It is named after Four Star Admiral Robert B. Carney who served as Chief of Naval Operations during the Eisenhower administration.

History
The park was established on May 21, 1966 by the Morale, Welfare, and Recreation Command (MWR) of the United States Department of Defense. It was originally established and administered by the United States Navy under the auspices of Naples' Naval Support Activity (NSA). The Morale and Welfare Authority (MWA) of AFSOUTH, under the direction of facilities engineer Col. Frank D. McCoy designed and built the nine-hole golf course in 1969. The golf course and recreational facilities were administered separately from the NSA by AFSOUTH until 1995. At that time, AFSOUTH turned over administration of the golf course to the NSA, thus consolidating the oversight of all resources at the site under the NSA's MWR.

Wildly popular for Overseas Brats, they enjoyed 80s music at the pool, drive in movie theater, and concerts.  The best being Cheap Trick in 1984.  Other events included Fiesta American where locals could buy lumpia from the Pacific or enjoy Corn on the Cobb from Nebraska.

Facilities
According to its facilities brochure, as of 2008, Carney Park's resources consisted of:
a 9-hole golf course, 
Olympic size outdoor swimming pool, 
5 adult size softball fields, 
1 adult size baseball field, 
2 little league baseball fields, 
1 little league softball field, 
1 football field and 1 soccer pitch, 
4 lighted tennis courts, 
2 batting cages, 
1 outdoor basketball court, 
4 sandlot volleyball courts, 
horseshoe pits, 
20 small picnic sites, 11 large picnic areas, a boy and girl scout camp area, 30 tent sites, and 25 cabins, 
1 paintball field, a youth center, a teen center, a snack bar and restaurant.

References

External links

Virtual globetrotting
Navy Outdoor recreation
 Park History and Facilities

Dormant volcanoes
Parks in Campania